Best of X is a sales pitching competition in Germany in key locations. The Best of X program starts with the application or recommendation of startups to the Board of Ambassadors; consisting of key people in the startup scene: serial entrepreneurs, venture capitalists and business angels, influential corporates, etc.. Each of the region's most influential entrepreneurial institutions nominate 8 candidates, two more startups join the final event by winning the public vote. At the final event the 10 startups will introduce themselves, deliver a pitch which is followed by a Q&A by the jury. 
Among the partners of Best of X are the biggest German venture capital fund High-Tech Gründerfonds, the state bank of North Rhine-Westphalia NRW.BANK, the ESA and several others.

References
 Article in the newspaper 'Express'
 TÜV about the success of BOX
 German 'Gründerszene' about BOX in Munich ´

External links
 

Entrepreneurship organizations
Events in Munich